Parotocinclus jumbo is a fish in the family Loricariidae native to South America. It is found swimming in the Paraiba do Norte and Piranhas rivers in Paraiba State, Canhotinho River in Pernambuco State, a tributary of the Mundau River, flowing near the city of Maceio in Alagoas State, and Salgado River in Ceara State, Brazil.

References

Britski, H.A. and J.C. Garavello, 2002. Parotocinclus jumbo, a new species of the subfamily Hypoptopomatinae from northeastern Brazil (Ostariophysi: Loricariidae). Ichthyol. Explor. Freshwat. 13(3):279-288. 

Otothyrinae
Freshwater fish of Brazil
Taxa named by Heraldo Antonio Britski
Taxa named by Júlio César Garavello
Fish described in 2002